Kavis Reed (born February 24, 1973) is a former Canadian Football League (CFL) defensive back, head coach and general manager. He was most recently the GM of the Montreal Alouettes from December 2016 until July 2019. He also served three years as the head coach of the Edmonton Eskimos, leading them to one West Final game. He played professionally as a defensive back for the Eskimos from 1995 to 1999.

Playing career
Reed played for the Edmonton Eskimos from 1995 to 1999. He was named a CFL All-Star in 1997 and played in his first and only Grey Cup which was a loss to the Toronto Argonauts. In the following off-season, he signed with the Kansas City Chiefs in February 1998 but soon after re-joined the Eskimos in August 1998. He suffered a career-ending neck injury in 1999 and retired soon after. He finished his professional playing career with 205 tackles, 20 interceptions, and five touchdowns in 67 games played.

Coaching career
After 10 years as an assistant coach in the CFL, Reed was hired as head coach for the Edmonton Eskimos, being named the 19th head coach in Eskimos history on December 10, 2010 after signing a three-year contract. He was released from a contract extension November 4, 2013 after an unsuccessful season. Reed also served as the interim coach for the Als in 2017 after the firing of Jacques Chapdelaine, finishing the season with seven straight losses.

Head coaching record

General manager career 
Reed was announced as the general manager of the Montreal Alouettes on December 14, 2016, after the 2016 CFL season. Reed briefly expanded his role as GM to include the role of head coach after the firing of Jacques Chapdelaine in 2017. On July 14, 2019, after a 2–2 start to the 2019 season, Montreal Alouettes president and CEO Patrick Boivin relieved Reed of his duties as general manager. The reason for the firing was not made known in the midst of the impending sale of the club to new ownership.

General managing record

References

External links
Edmonton Eskimos bio 
Montreal Alouettes bio

1973 births
Living people
Edmonton Elks coaches
Hamilton Tiger-Cats coaches
Montreal Alouettes coaches
Montreal Alouettes general managers
Ottawa Renegades coaches
People from Georgetown, South Carolina
Saskatchewan Roughriders coaches
Toronto Argonauts coaches
Winnipeg Blue Bombers coaches